Parliamentary elections were held in the Republic of Upper Volta on 20 December 1970, following the restoration of multi-party democracy in a referendum earlier in the year. The result was a victory for the former sole legal party, the Voltaic Democratic Union–African Democratic Rally, which won 37 of the 57 seats in the National Assembly. Voter turnout was 48.3%.

Results

References

Elections in Burkina Faso
Upper Volta
1970 in Upper Volta
Election and referendum articles with incomplete results